For calypso monarchs of Trinidad and Tobago see Calypso Monarch.
For the titular queen of the indigenous people of Trinidad and Tobago, see Carib Queen
For the history of Trinidad and Tobago before it became a republic, see History of Trinidad and Tobago and Queen of Trinidad and Tobago.

See also 
Principality of Trinidad